Gitanjali International School Bangalore (GISB) is a Residential school in Bangalore, India. It is located in the outskirts of Bangalore near the Bengaluru International Airport. The school is a part of the Geethanjali Group of Institutions. It follows CBSE syllabus.

History
Gitanjali International School Bangalore was established in 1998, it is a part of the Geethanjali Group of Institutions which was founded by H.S. Sridhara Murthy and Nagarathna S. Murthy with a belief that "Mind is not a vessel to be filled but a fire to be kindled". The group is being operated by educationists and intellectuals who specialize in the field of child psychology and various knowledge systems.

Facilities
The school has Wi-fi enabled campus, World class Library, Science Labs, IT Labs, CCTV all over the campus. It also imparts indoor sports games such as Volleyball court, Basketball court, badminton, Tennis.

See also
 Jain International Residential School

References

External links 
 

International schools in Bangalore
Boarding schools in Karnataka